The 2nd African Youth Games took place in Gaborone, Botswana's capital city from 22 to 31 May 2014. The Games featured approximately 2000 athletes from 51 African countries competing in 21 sports. Gambia, Eritrea and Mauritania were the only African countries absent from the Games.

The Botswana African Youth Games Organising Committee (BAYGOC) was charged with organising the Games and was headed by Regina Sikalesele Vaka as Chairman while Tuelo Daniel Serufho led the Secretariat as its chief executive officer.

The Games were largely perceived as a success and helped boost the profile of certain sports. In addition, certain sporting codes benefited by receiving material or equipment, but the Botswana National Olympic Committee and other federations were also reportedly left with debt following the event

Bidding process

Logo

Participating nations 

  

 (host)

Sports 
Twenty one sports were contested in this edition of African Youth Games.

Venues
Venues of the 2014 African Youth Games are listed below.

Medal table

Calendar

Participating nations

References

External links 
 Daily News
 Official site (archived)
Results (archived)
 African Youth Games Schedule

 
African Youth Games
Multi-sport events in Botswana
African Youth Games
African Youth Games
Youth Games
21st century in Gaborone
International sports competitions hosted by Botswana
2014 in youth sport